Cancer Council Australia is a national, nonprofit organisation which aims to promote cancer-control policies and to reduce the illness caused by cancer in Australia. It advises various groups, including the government, on cancer-related issues, acts as an advocate for cancer patients and their friends, and is a major funding contributor towards health research, prevention and education.

Background
Cancer Council Australia formed in 1961 as the Australian Cancer Society. It was renamed Cancer Council Australia in 1997 and appointed Alan Coates its inaugural CEO.

Cancer Council Australia includes eight member organisations, which operate in their individual states and territories:

Cancer Council Australian Capital Territory
Cancer Council New South Wales
Cancer Council Northern Territory
Cancer Council Queensland
Cancer Council South Australia
Cancer Council Tasmania
Cancer Council Victoria
Cancer Council Western Australia

Dietary advice

Cancer Council Australia advocates a diet rich in plant-based foods to prevent cancer such as at least two servings of fruit and five servings of vegetables, including legumes and at least four servings of whole grains per day. They also encourage people to consume at least two and a half servings of dairy products per day and at least two servings of oily fish per week.

Events

Australia's Biggest Morning Tea
One of Cancer Council's major fundraisers is Australia's Biggest Morning Tea. On 26 May 2005, the event broke the Guinness Book of Records record for the "World's Largest Simultaneous Tea Party" with around 1 million Australians participating and supporting Cancer Council on the day.

Daffodil Day
Daffodil Day is the Australian Cancer Council's most iconic fund-raising event. It takes place in August each year.

Junk Free June
Junk Free June is a new, healthier, fundraiser, supporting Cancer Council Queensland's work in cancer research. Junk Free June encourages participants to give up junk food such as packaged snacks high in sugar, refined carbohydrates and trans fats. According to World Cancer Research Fund International, approximately one third of the most common cancers can be prevented through a nutritious diet and maintaining a healthy weight and regular physical activity.

Cancer Council Legacy
The Cancer Council has contributed a lot to Australia's society by helping people who are suffering with cancer or any cancerous illness. The Clive Deverall Society was launched in 2004 by the Cancer Council Western Australia as a way of thanking people who have included a gift in their Will to Cancer Council Western Australia.

See also 

Australian Melanoma Research Foundation
Cancer Institute of New South Wales

References

External links
Official website

Cancer organisations based in Australia
Health charities in Australia
1961 establishments in Australia
Organizations established in 1961
Medical and health organisations based in New South Wales
Sunscreen brands